Colleen Hardwick is a Canadian urban geographer, film maker, tech entrepreneur and politician in Vancouver, British Columbia, who served on Vancouver City Council from 2018 to 2022. Hardwick is the daughter of former Vancouver alderman Walter Hardwick, and granddaughter of former Vancouver park commissioner Iris Hardwick. She began a career in urban planning after taking her undergraduate degree at UBC but shifted course to film, then technology, then politics.

Early career

Hardwick worked on dozens of film and television projects through a twenty-five year career. 
She spent seven years free-lancing as a location and production manager before forming her first company, New City Productions, in 1991. A longtime member of the Directors Guild of Canada, she served as national secretary-treasurer from 1989 to 1992. In 1993 The Financial Post named Hardwick one of the thirteen most powerful people in the British Columbia film industry. 
When New City was acquired by Sextant Entertainment Group in 1999, Hardwick assumed the role of president of their motion picture division. Four years as chief executive officer of New City Entertainment group followed. For New City Productions, Hardwick won a 1997 “Forty under 40” award in entrepreneurship from Business in Vancouver.

Evolving from film production to film industry technology, Hardwick developed MovieSet Inc., a platform to monetize movies under production.

In 2010, applying technology to the information-gathering phase of urban planning, she founded PlaceSpeak, a location-based civic engagement platform designed to consult with people within specific geographic boundaries.

Civic politics

Hardwick announced her candidacy for Vancouver city council in the summer of 2005. She campaigned with the Non-Partisan Association (NPA) against a proposal to use assets from Vancouver's Property Endowment fund to build housing that would not yield a return on the investment, claiming her Vision Vancouver opponents “don’t even understand how market housing works.” Hardwick had the endorsement of The Vancouver Sun’s editorial board ahead of the November election. With ten councillors to be elected, she placed thirteenth.

A second run in 2018 was successful. Again running under the NPA banner, Hardwick came fifth. On a council with no party majority, she frequently questioned some of the initiatives and policies brought forth, and regularly voiced concerns about what she calls "scope-creep" where the municipal government dedicates resources to issues traditionally in the realm of other levels of government.

Hardwick was elected as a member of the NPA but resigned from that organization in April 2021 to sit as an independent councillor. Five months later, Hardwick announced her affiliation with a new civic party, TEAM for a Livable Vancouver, and on March 13, 2022 was acclaimed as TEAM's mayoral candidate for the October 2022 election. Hardwick came in third in the 2022 Vancouver mayoral election with almost 10% of the vote.

While on council, Hardwick was the driving force behind the establishment of an independent auditor general for Vancouver.

Electoral record

References

Living people
Non-Partisan Association councillors
Year of birth missing (living people)
Women in British Columbia politics
Women municipal councillors in Canada
21st-century Canadian politicians
21st-century Canadian women politicians